The Worms family is a family from Frankfurt and England, tracing its descent from Aaron Worms of Frankfurt am Main in the middle of the eighteenth century. Aaron's great-great-grandson was created hereditary baron of the Austrian empire on April 23, 1871, and a later descendant, Baron Henry de Worms, was raised to the British peerage as Lord Pirbright.

Members
 René Worms, French auditor of the council of state, sociologist, founder of the Institut International de Sociologie in 1893. 
 Eleazar ben Judah ben Kalonymus of Worms, Talmudist and cabalist
 Henry de Worms, 1st Baron Pirbright, English statesman
 Jacqueline Worms de Romilly (Jacqueline de Romilly), French philosopher, see French article

Surnames
Jewish-German families
Jewish French history